"That's Cool" is a song recorded by American country music duo Blue County.  It was released in May 2004 as the second single from the album Blue County.  The song reached #24 on the Billboard Hot Country Singles & Tracks chart.  The song was written by the duo's members Aaron Benward and Scott Reeves along with Lee Thomas Miller.

Chart performance

References

2004 singles
2004 songs
Blue County (duo) songs
Songs written by Lee Thomas Miller
Song recordings produced by Doug Johnson (record producer)
Song recordings produced by Dann Huff
Curb Records singles
Songs written by Aaron Benward